Road 36 is a road in eastern Iran. It connects Firuzkuh to Semnan and to Road 81, Damghan–Nain Road. Then it goes through the newly built section between Tarud and Biyarjomand to Bardaskan continuing towards Taybad and Afghanistan's Islam Qala via Torbat-e Heydarieh.

References

External links 

 Iran road map on Young Journalists Club

AH1
Roads in Iran